Rhubaba Gallery and Studios (established 2009) is an artist-run gallery and studios in Edinburgh, Scotland, co-founded by Edinburgh College of Art (ECA) graduates Frances Stacey, Rachel Adams, Tom Nolan, Catherine Payton and Claire Davies. They provide studio spaces for artists and practitioners alongside an annual changing programme of exhibitions and events. Rhubaba is a Scottish Charitable Incorporated Organisation, charity number SC043963 and most recently received Open Project funding from Creative Scotland in 2016 and 2015.

Notable exhibitions and events 
 Blind Love Bad Taste (2017), Siôn Parkinson & Rhubaba Choir
 The Dilapidated Dwelling (2015), Patrick Keiller
 OUTPOST Open: Film, a touring programme of films selected from OUTPOST artist membership, 2011, 2012 and 2013.
 Subject to Alignment (2011), Frances Stacey and Tom Nolan 
Their exhibitions and events have featured in Edinburgh Art Festival's (EAF) programme in 2013 and 2016.

References

External links 
 Rhubaba Gallery and Studios

Art museums and galleries in Edinburgh